Hans Hellbrand (29 August 1925 – 31 December 2013) was a Swedish water polo player. He competed in the men's tournament at the 1952 Summer Olympics.

References

External links
 

1925 births
2013 deaths
Swedish male water polo players
Olympic water polo players of Sweden
Water polo players at the 1952 Summer Olympics
Sportspeople from Norrköping